Hydrocortisone is the name for the hormone cortisol when supplied as a medication. Uses include conditions such as adrenocortical insufficiency, adrenogenital syndrome, high blood calcium, thyroiditis, rheumatoid arthritis, dermatitis, asthma, and COPD. It is the treatment of choice for adrenocortical insufficiency. It can be given by mouth, topically, or by injection. Stopping treatment after long-term use should be done slowly.

Side effects may include mood changes, increased risk of infection, and edema (swelling). With long-term use common side effects include osteoporosis, upset stomach, physical weakness, easy bruising, and candidiasis (yeast infections). It is unclear if it is safe for use during pregnancy. Hydrocortisone is a glucocorticoid and works as an anti-inflammatory and by immune suppression.

Hydrocortisone was patented in 1936 and approved for medical use in 1941. It is on the World Health Organization's List of Essential Medicines. It is available as a generic medication. In 2020, it was the 149th most commonly prescribed medication in the United States, with more than 3million prescriptions.

Medical uses
Hydrocortisone is the pharmaceutical term for cortisol used in oral administration, intravenous injection, or topical application. It is used as an immunosuppressive drug, given by injection in the treatment of severe allergic reactions such as anaphylaxis and angioedema, in place of prednisolone in patients needing steroid treatment but unable to take oral medication, and perioperatively in patients on long-term steroid treatment to prevent an adrenal crisis. It may also be injected into inflamed joints resulting from diseases such as gout.

It may be used topically for allergic rashes, eczema, psoriasis, itching and other inflammatory skin conditions. Topical hydrocortisone creams and ointments are available in most countries without prescription in strengths ranging from 0.05% to 2.5% (depending on local regulations) with stronger forms available by prescription only.

Pharmacology

Pharmacodynamics
Hydrocortisone is a corticosteroid, acting specifically as both a glucocorticoid and as a mineralocorticoid. That is, it is an agonist of the glucocorticoid and mineralocorticoid receptors.

Hydrocortisone has low potency relative to synthetic corticosteroids. Compared to hydrocortisone, prednisolone is about 4 times as potent and dexamethasone about 40 times as potent in terms of anti-inflammatory effect. Prednisolone can also be used as cortisol replacement, and at replacement dose levels (rather than anti-inflammatory levels), prednisolone is about eight times more potent than cortisol.

Pharmacokinetics
Most cortisol in the blood (all but about 4%) is bound to proteins, including corticosteroid binding globulin (CBG) and serum albumin. Free cortisol passes easily through cellular membranes, explaining its 100% bioavailability after oral administration. Inside cells it interacts with corticosteroid receptors.

Chemistry

Hydrocortisone, also known as 11β,17α,21-trihydroxypregn-4-ene-3,20-dione, is a naturally occurring pregnane steroid. A variety of hydrocortisone esters exist and have been marketed for medical use.

Society and culture

Legal status 
On 25 March 2021, the Committee for Medicinal Products for Human Use (CHMP) of the European Medicines Agency (EMA) adopted a positive opinion, recommending the granting of a marketing authorization for the medicinal product Efmody, intended for the treatment of congenital adrenal hyperplasia (CAH) in people aged twelve years and older. The applicant for this medicinal product is Diurnal Europe BV. Hydrocortisone (Efmody) was approved for medical use in the European Union, in May 2021, for the treatment of congenital adrenal hyperplasia (CAH) in people aged twelve years and older.

Research

COVID-19
Hydrocortisone was found to be effective in reducing mortality rate of critically ill COVID-19 patients when compared to other usual care or a placebo.

References

External links 
 

Alcohols
Antipruritics
CYP3A4 inducers
Glucocorticoids
Ketones
Mineralocorticoids
Orphan drugs
Pregnanes
World Health Organization essential medicines
Wikipedia medicine articles ready to translate